The Seoul National University Museum of Art (SNUMoA) is a museum in Seoul National University.

History

1995 Prof. Jong-Sang Lee proposes the establishment of the MoA and the Samsung Cultural foundation promises to fund the creation of the museum. The Seoul National University Campus Planning Committee selects the location for the future museum.
1996 Officials from the Samsung Foundation of Culture and Rem Koolhaas conduct a field investigation of the building’s site.
1997 Schematic Design Completed.
2004 Construction of the structure begins.
2005 The construction of the structure is completed.
2006 The Museum of Art opens on June 8.

Exhibitions
The SNUMoA holds regular exhibitions of students’ work as well as work from international and domestic designers and artists.

2012
Spring 2011 College of Fine arts, SNU, Ph.D. Graduate Exhibition
Dongsangyimong
Vogue Moment
Magical Realism in the Netherlands: from traditional to contemporary
Art in textbooks

2011
Always on my mind: home + home
Hanunseong- hanun Castle Exhibition
Giuseppe Verdi dedicated exhibition
Design noir: seven kinds of fiction for the museum
David Hockney: 1861-1977, portfolio of four prints
Modern Life_-315
MoA picks 2011
Extent- materials, light, image | Dialogue with the Present
Omar Galicia, Seoul’s Soul
Joyce in Art
This Modern Western Japan
Designers in Residence 2-based: MoA of space exploration
Split into two streams with endless garden paths: Game + Interactive Media Art_2 Part
MoA Invites_gijeungjeon Seoul National University Museum of Art 2011

2010
A tactual map also palpable
Five Senses
Seoul National University College of Fine Arts graduation exhibition
 Split into two streams with endless garden paths: Game + Interactive Media Art
Portrait of Korean War
Bergemann exhibition
White Spring
Yoo Lizzy, A Retrospective of 40 Years of Metal Works
Singwangseok – between education and creation 
Seoul National Museum of Art Video Series, MoA Cine Forum 6_gestures of healing
Residence, Seoul National University Museum of Art designer space exploration 1st MoA

2009
 Jangukjin
Spring 2009,College of Fine Arts Graduate Exhibition
Jeonsucheon
Drawing of the world, the world’s drawing
50-year journey, Gwonsunhyeong Pottery
Dream of two kinds of art: with the Italian masters of the world print workshop meeting of 2RC
Screw Tape Letters 
 World Saving Machine

Architecture
The SNUMoA was designed by Rem Koolhaas. The structure's exterior is made of U-glass which reveals the underlying structural steel framed trusses. The building is located on sloping site which the architect utilized in the final design. The museum is cantilevered on a concrete core, thus giving the appearance of lightness and floating in space.
The museum is divided into four basic program areas: Operations, Educational, Exhibition, and Library. The slope of the building benefits the auditorium which has ramped seating.

Directions
Once you arrive, the MoA is located to the left of the main gate of the Seoul National University Gwanak Campus. Take the subway or a bus to the main gate and walk up the staircase of the amphi-plaza which is to the left of the gate.

Transportation
By Bus: 5511, 5512 (previously 413), 5513, 5516 and 5518. 
By Subway: Seoul National University Station, Line 2, Exit No. 3. School shuttle buses are available from this exit.

See also
List of museums in South Korea

References

External links
Official site

2006 establishments in South Korea
Art museums and galleries in Seoul
Gwanak District
Museums established in 2006
Rem Koolhaas buildings
Seoul National University
University museums in South Korea